Miss Wonderful is a 1959 album by Peggy Lee that was arranged and conducted by Sy Oliver.

Track listing
 "Mr. Wonderful" (George Weiss, Jerry Bock, Larry Holofcener) 	- 3:18
 "They Can't Take That Away from Me" (George Gershwin, Ira Gershwin)	 - 2:56
 "Where Flamingos Fly" (El Thea, Harold Courlander, John Benson Brooks) - 2:28
 "You've Got to See Mamma Ev'ry Night (Or You Can't See Mamma at All)" (Con Conrad, Billy Rose) 	 - 2:45
 "The Come Back" (L.C. Fraser) - 3:01
 "Take a Little Time to Smile" (Dave Barbour, Peggy Lee)	- 2:36
 "I Don't Know Enough About You" (Barbour, Lee) - 2:55
 "Joey, Joey, Joey" (Frank Loesser) - 2:43
 "Crazy in the Heart" (Alec Wilder, Bill Engvick) - 2:54
 "You Oughtta Be Mine" (Curtis Lewis) - 3:05
 "We Laughed at Love" (Charles Bourne, Sam Messenheimer) - 3:12
 "That's Alright, Honey" (Charles Singleton, Rose Marie McCoy) - 3:08

Personnel
 Peggy Lee - vocals

References

1959 albums
Peggy Lee albums
Decca Records albums
Albums produced by Milt Gabler
Albums conducted by Sy Oliver
Albums arranged by Sy Oliver